The Ali ebn-e Sahl mausoleum is a historical mausoleum in Isfahan, Iran. The mystic Abolhassan Ali ebn-e Sahl Azhar Esfahani lived in the era of the Al-Mu'tadid, the Abbasid caliph. He had a khanqah and a school in the north of the Toghchi cemetery. He died in 894 in Isfahan and was buried in his khanqah.

The Ali ebn-e Sahl mausoleum became a meeting place of mystics and dervishes. At present the mausoleum belongs to the Khaksari dervishes. the mausoleum has a vast garden. The larger part of the garden is under the possession of the Welfare Organisation.

Description 
Ali ebn-e Sahl's grave is located in the middle of the cross-shaped building. Its gravestone is quadrilateral. It is 2 m long and 120 cm high. It has been decorated with yellow, white, blue and black tiles. The names of Ali and Mohammad have been written on the tiles. There are also other gravestones in the structure. The mausoleum is open to visitors every day except Thursday afternoon.

See also
List of the historical structures in the Isfahan province

References 

Buildings and structures completed in the 9th century
Mausoleums in Isfahan